Irina-Camelia Begu and Monica Niculescu were the defending champions, but they chose not to participate this year.

Arina Rodionova and Storm Sanders won the title, defeating Barbara Haas and Ellen Perez in the final, 6–3, 6–3. This was Rodionova's first WTA tour level title.

Seeds

Draw

Draw

References

External links
Main Draw

Doubles
Thailand Open - Doubles
 in women's tennis